Adam Cooney (born 30 September 1985) is a former professional Australian rules footballer who played for the Western Bulldogs and Essendon Football Club in the Australian Football League (AFL). He won the Brownlow Medal in 2008, with 24 votes becoming the tenth Western Bulldogs player to win the award.

Early life
Cooney attended Flagstaff Hill R-7 Schools, Blackwood High School and later Aberfoyle Park High School and played for the Flagstaff Hill Football Club.

AFL career
Cooney was noted as a pacey player who could kick goals on the run from outside the 50-metre arc as well as snap kicks near the goal posts.
Cooney debuted in Round 1 2004 against the West Coast Eagles, where he recorded 8 disposals and kicked a goal, and his first season saw him play 19 games and kick 11 goals for the season. He had a vastly improved 2005 season: he played every game, averaged 20 possessions a game and kicked 21 goals.  He was ranked second for clearances in the Bulldogs team.

Cooney progressed to the elite of the competition, four seasons after being selected as the number one draft pick. His threat as a goalkicking midfielder grew, in 2006 and 2007 he kicked 30 & 28 goals respectively, he then pushed into the upper bracket of ball winners, by collecting 458 and 469 total disposals over the 2006 & 2007 season, while maintaining his average of more than a goal per game and also directly assisting in many scores. 

Cooney was rewarded for a strong 2008 season by winning the Brownlow Medal. He polled 24 votes, beating Brisbane Lions midfielder Simon Black by one vote. Cooney is the first No. 1 draft pick (and the first player taken as a priority draft pick) to win the award.
His 2008 season saw him amass 637 total disposals and boot 23 goals, highlighted by a 25 disposal, 5 goal outing against the Sydney Swans in Round 7. He played 25 total games in 2008 and averaged 25.5 disposals per game. 

In 2009, Adam had another great season, playing 23 games, kicking 14 goals and averaging 26.8 disposals, although he only managed to poll 3 Brownlow Medal Votes. He also featured in the official advertisement for the AFL, brushing off tacklers including a bull in a bullfighting ring.

From the 2010-2012 season Cooney struggled with injury and form, his impact on game, particularly his goal kicking was very minimal, as he only provided 27 majors over 3 seasons, and playing a total of 47 games in that span. 

Cooney then bounced back in 2013, playing 19 games, kicking 19 goals and tallying 485 disposals for the season. 

The 2014 season was Cooney's final year at the Bulldogs, he kicked 13 goals and played 18 games. His last game for the Dog's saw him tally 20 disposals and 2 tackles, a game in which the Dog's lost to the GWS Giants. 

The 2015 season was Cooney's first in the red and black, he only managed 11 games and kicked 10 goals, including 3 on debut against the Sydney Swans in Round 1. 

The Essendon Supplements Saga   ordeal allowed Adam more of an opportunity to play regular senior football during the 2016 season. He managed to play 20 games and kick 6 goals, he also tallied 457 disposals. In August 2016, Cooney announced he would retire after the round 22 match against  at Etihad Stadium.
His final AFL game was also his 250th game and was fittingly against his old side, the Bulldogs, he gathered 22 disposals and kicked a goal.

Personal life
Cooney proposed to his partner Haylea McCann with a Burger Ring. On 24 October 2009, he and McCann married in a ceremony at Glenelg Beach, Adelaide.

Statistics
''

|- style="background-color: #EAEAEA"
! scope="row" style="text-align:center" | 2004
|
| 17 || 19 || 11 || 12 || 119 || 105 || 224 || 44 || 30 || 0.6 || 0.6 || 6.3 || 5.5 || 11.8 || 2.3 || 1.6 || 3
|-
! scope="row" style="text-align:center" | 2005
|
| 17 || 22 || 21 || 13 || 236 || 198 || 434 || 93 || 56 || 1.0 || 0.6 || 10.7 || 9.0 || 19.7 || 4.2 || 2.5 || 12
|- style="background:#eaeaea;"
! scope="row" style="text-align:center" | 2006
|
| 17 || 24 || 30 || 19 || 242 || 216 || 458 || 128 || 60 || 1.3 || 0.8 || 10.1 || 9.0 || 19.1 || 5.3 || 2.5 || 4
|-
! scope="row" style="text-align:center" | 2007
|
| 17 || 22 || 28 || 21 || 262 || 207 || 469 || 112 || 79 || 1.3 || 1.0 || 11.9 || 9.4 || 21.3 || 5.1 || 3.6 || 9
|- style="background:#eaeaea;"
! scope="row" style="text-align:center" | 2008
|
| 17 || 25 || 23 || 6 || 311 || 326 || 637 || 98 || 65 || 0.9 || 0.2 || 12.4 || 13.0 || 25.5 || 3.9 || 2.6 || 24
|-
! scope="row" style="text-align:center" | 2009
|
| 17 || 23 || 14 || 15 || 277 || 340 || 617 || 81 || 58 || 0.6 || 0.7 || 12.0 || 14.8 || 26.8 || 3.5 || 2.5 || 3
|- style="background:#eaeaea;"
! scope="row" style="text-align:center" | 2010
|
| 17 || 20 || 9 || 12 || 263 || 252 || 515 || 79 || 60 || 0.5 || 0.6 || 13.2 || 12.6 || 25.8 || 4.0 || 3.0 || 8
|-
! scope="row" style="text-align:center" | 2011
|
| 17 || 13 || 9 || 8 || 156 || 129 || 285 || 38 || 40 || 0.7 || 0.6 || 12.0 || 9.9 || 21.9 || 2.9 || 3.1 || 2
|-style="background:#eaeaea;"
! scope="row" style="text-align:center" | 2012
|
| 17 || 14 || 9 || 6 || 162 || 131 || 293 || 38 || 37 || 0.6 || 0.4 || 11.6 || 9.4 || 20.9 || 2.7 || 2.6 || 3
|-
! scope="row" style="text-align:center" | 2013
|
| 17 || 19 || 19 || 11 || 264 || 221 || 485 || 82 || 44 || 1.0 || 0.6 || 13.9 || 11.6 || 25.5 || 4.3 || 2.3 || 7
|-style="background:#eaeaea;"
! scope="row" style="text-align:center" | 2014
|
| 17 || 18 || 13 || 6 || 190 || 164 || 354 || 67 || 59 || 0.7 || 0.3 || 10.6 || 9.1 || 19.7 || 3.7 || 3.3 || 7
|-
! scope="row" style="text-align:center" | 2015
|
| 13 || 11 || 10 || 4 || 123 || 64 || 187 || 33 || 25 || 0.9 || 0.4 || 11.2 || 5.8 || 17.0 || 3.0 || 2.3 || 0
|-style="background:#eaeaea;"
! scope="row" style="text-align:center" | 2016
|
| 17 || 20 || 6 || 14 || 259 || 198 || 457 || 116 || 57 || 0.3 || 0.7 || 13.0 || 9.9 || 22.8 || 5.8 || 2.8 || 4
|- class="sortbottom"
! colspan=3| Career
! 250
! 202
! 147
! 2864
! 2551
! 5415
! 1009
! 670
! 0.8
! 0.6
! 11.5
! 10.2
! 21.7
! 4.0
! 2.7
! 86
|}

Honours and achievements

Individual
Brownlow Medal: 2008
All-Australian Team: 2008
Dream Team Representative Honours in AFL Hall of Fame Tribute Match: 2008
AFL Rising Star Nominee: 2004 (Round 21)
Number 1 AFL Draft Pick: 2003

References

External links

1985 births
Living people
Western Bulldogs players
West Adelaide Football Club players
All-Australians (AFL)
Brownlow Medal winners
Essendon Football Club players
Flagstaff Hill Football Club players
Australian rules footballers from Adelaide